Game Creek may refer to:

Game Creek, Alaska, a census-designated place
Game Creek (New Jersey), a tributary of the Salem River
Game Creek (Teton County, Wyoming), a stream